Mambas are fast-moving, highly venomous snakes of the genus Dendroaspis (which literally means "tree asp") in the family Elapidae.  Four extant species are recognised currently; three of those four species are essentially arboreal and green in colour, whereas the black mamba, Dendroaspis polylepis, is largely terrestrial and generally brown or grey in colour. All are native to various regions in sub-Saharan Africa and all are feared throughout their ranges, especially the black mamba. In Africa there are many legends and stories about mambas.

Behaviour
The three green species of mambas are arboreal, whereas the black mamba is largely terrestrial. The black mamba is one of the largest and most venomous snakes in Africa. All four species are active diurnal hunters, preying on birds, lizards, and small mammals. At nightfall some species, especially the terrestrial black mamba, shelter in a lair. A mamba may retain the same lair for years.

Mambas and cobras are in the same family: the Elapidae. Like cobras, a mamba may rear and form a hood as part of its threat display, but the mamba's hood is narrower and is longer than the broader hood of some species of cobra, such as say, the spectacled cobras of parts of Asia. In their threat display mambas commonly open their mouths; the black mamba's mouth is black within, which renders the threat more conspicuous. Typically also, a rearing mamba tends to lean well forward, instead of standing erect as a cobra does.

Stories of black mambas that chase and attack humans are common, but in fact the snakes generally avoid contact with humans. Most apparent cases of pursuit probably are examples of where witnesses have mistaken the snake's attempt to retreat to its lair when a human happens to be in the way. The black mamba usually uses its speed to escape from threats, and humans actually are their main predators, rather than prey.

Venom

All mambas are highly venomous.  Untreated black mamba bites have a mortality rate of 100%. The other mamba species are much less dangerous: their venoms are less toxic (based upon  studies); their temperaments generally not as aggressive or as explosive when provoked - and they don't inject as much venom. Fatalities have become much rarer due to wide availability of antivenom. The most potent black mamba venom  published was 0.05 mg/kg (0.01-0.18 mg/kg) via SC route.

Mamba venoms contains both pre-synaptic and post-synaptic neurotoxins (the major neurotoxins are known as dendrotoxins and short chain alpha-neurotoxins). Besides the neurotoxins, they also carry cardiotoxins and fasciculins. Other components may include calcicludine, which is a known component of the eastern green mamba's venom and calciseptine, which is a component of black mamba venom. Toxicity of individual specimens within the same species and subspecies can vary greatly based on several factors, including diet, geographical region, health/size of the snake, etc. Even the weather and altitude can influence toxicity (Ernst and Zug et al. 1996). 

Eastern green mamba envenomation, although rapid in onset of symptoms, is considerably less deadly in comparison to the other three species. Although the eastern green mamba has caused death, most of the recorded bites in the literature involved mild neurotoxic symptoms and recovery with little to no medical treatment. The western green mambas (D. viridis and D. jamesonii) are intermediate in severity, causing more severe envenomation than the eastern green mamba, but less severe than the black mamba.

Mamba toxins
Mamba toxin (or dendrotoxin) consists of several components, with different targets. Examples are:
Dendrotoxin 1, which inhibits the K+ channels at the pre and post-synaptic level in the intestinal smooth muscle. It also inhibits Ca2+-sensitive K+ channels from rat skeletal muscle‚ incorporated into planar bilayers (Kd = 90 nM in 50 mM KCl).)
Dendrotoxin 3, which inhibits acetylcholine M4 receptors.
Dendrotoxin 7, commonly referred to as muscarinic toxin 7 (MT7) inhibits acetylcholine M1 receptors.
Dendrotoxin K, structurally homologous to Kunitz-type proteinase inhibitors with activity as a selective blocker of voltage-gated potassium channels

Taxonomy
Dendroaspis, is derived from Ancient Greek déndron (δένδρον), meaning "tree", and aspis (ασπίς), which is understood to mean "shield", but also denotes "cobra" or simply "snake", in particular "snake with hood (shield)". Via Latin aspis, it is the source of the English word "asp". In ancient texts, aspis or asp often referred to the Egyptian cobra (Naja haje), in reference to its shield-like hood. The genus was first described by the German naturalist Hermann Schlegel in 1848, with Elaps jamesonii as the type species. It was misspelt as Dendraspis by Dumeril in 1856, and generally uncorrected by subsequent authors. In 1936, Dutch herpetologist Leo Brongersma pointed out that the correct spelling was Dendroaspis but added that the name was invalid as Fitzinger had coined Dendraspis in 1843 for the king cobra and hence had priority. However, in 1962 German herpetologist Robert Mertens proposed that the 1843 description of Dendraspis by Fitzinger be suppressed due to its similarity to Dendroaspis, and the confusion it would cause by its use.

Range and characteristics
Black mambas live in the savannas and rocky hills of southern and eastern Africa. They are Africa's longest venomous snake, reaching up to 14 feet in length, although 8.2 feet is more the average. They are also among the fastest snakes in the world, slithering at speeds of up to 12.5 miles per hour.

* Including the nominate subspecies. 
T Type species.

Phylogeny 
A 2018 analysis of the venom of the mambas, as well as a 2016 genetic analysis, found the following cladogram representative of the relationship between the species.

Notes

References

 
Muscarinic antagonists